Hughes Airfield (32 Mile) is an airfield in the Northern Territory of Australia located in the locality of Hughes.  It was constructed during World War II for military use. The airfield now functions as a base for aerial firefighting aircraft to protect the outer rural suburbs of Darwin.

The airfield was built by the U.S. Army engineering unit, the 808th Engineer Aviation Battalion, from 10 March 1942 until 13 April 1942.

World War II use

Units based at Hughes Airfield
 No. 2 Squadron RAAF
 No. 13 Squadron RAAF
 No. 34 Squadron RAAF (15 July 1942 – 27 August 1942)
 No. 82 Squadron RAAF

Japanese Bombing Raids against Hughes Airfield
 23 August 1942 (12:12 pm)
 26 November 1942 (03.20 a.m.)
 27 November 1942 (03:56 - 04:46 am)

Present Day
On 5 September 2011, the Hughes Airfield was added to the Northern Territory Heritage Register.

On 25 January 2012, the Northern Territory Government awarded a contract to repair and resurface the airstrip to Downer EDI Works. This will better enable access to the strip for the Air Tractor AT-802 water-bombing aircraft, operated from the strip by Bushfires NT since 2009. In addition to the resurfacing works, a water tank has also been installed on site, allowing mobile pumps to be used to load firefighting aircraft.

It has been proposed that construction of the new satellite city of Weddell to the northwest should include a general aviation airport separate from Darwin International Airport. While no formal commitment to building a new general aviation facility in the Greater Darwin area has yet been made by the Northern Territory Government, the runway alignment of 11/29 at Hughes is the preferred option for such a concept.

References

External links

 OzatWar website
 Lt. Col Bernard L. Robinson Reports on the NT June 1942

Former Royal Australian Air Force bases
World War II airfields in Australia
Defunct airports in the Northern Territory
Airports established in 1942
1942 establishments in Australia
Northern Territory Heritage Register